When It's Just You and Me is a studio album by American country music singer Dottie West, released in 1977.

This album was Dottie West's first album under her new record label, United Artists, which she joined in 1976, after being dropped from her previous label, RCA records. This was the first album to show how West changed her style and sound. Her material began to get sexier and riskier, and her music was more uptempo, and more pop-sounding as well. In late 1976, the title track single was released and hit No. 19 on the Billboard Country charts in 1977, bringing West back with a decent hit, after being in a dry spell over the past two years. The song also showed off West's new style, among other recordings in this album.

Three other songs were released as singles from this album, "Every Word I Write", a cover version of the 1920s hit "Tonight You Belong to Me", and "That's All I Wanted to Know". Both "Every Word I Write" and "Tonight You Belong to Me", were Top 30 Country hits, while the other single didn't reach the Top 40. This album set the stage for West's other United Artists albums to come. The album also entered the Top Country Albums chart and reached No. 44 there, her first album to chart since 1975.

Track listing

Charts
Album – Billboard (North America)

Singles – Billboard (North America)

Dottie West albums
1977 albums
United Artists Records albums
Albums arranged by Bill Justis
Albums produced by Larry Butler (producer)